Xanthophyllum macrophyllum is a plant in the family Polygalaceae. The specific epithet  is from the Greek meaning "large leaf".

Description
The smooth bark is pale brown. The flowers are yellow or white, drying brown or blackish.

Distribution and habitat
Xanthophyllum macrophyllum is endemic to Borneo. Its habitat is lowland mixed dipterocarp forests or lower montane forests from sea-level to  altitude.

References

macrophyllum
Endemic flora of Borneo
Plants described in 1896